Princess Yi Gu-ji (? - 7 March 1489) was a Joseon Dynasty princess, writer, artist, and poet. She was forced to commit suicide after it was discovered that she had cohabited with a slave after being widowed.

Life 
Yi Gu-ji was an illegitimate daughter of Prince Yangnyeong, first son of the third Joseon king, Taejong of Joseon and Queen Wongyeong. Her mother was a palace slave of Crown Prince Yangnyeong, whom he had two children with. She had an unnamed sister.

Yi was given the title of Princess and married Gwon Deok-young, a lesser official, and went to live in Gwangju, her husband's hometown. They had two sons. Gwon died in 1470 and Yi was prevented from remarrying by social stigma, then by the issuing of the Anti-Remarriage Law of 1477.

Investigation
In 1475, it was reported to the Saheonbu that Yi had been cohabiting with her slave. Heo Gye (허계), the head department of the Saheonbu, requested that the situation be investigated without resorting to interrogation. He proposed that Cheonrye be moved to his residence, where the man could be questioned. One official reported that his son travelling from Gwangju had heard rumours of an aristocratic lady who was liaising with a slave, while another official said that his servant had observed Cheonrye sleeping and eating in the room next to his mistress' bedchamber. Seongjong, however, refused to arrest Yi based on gossip alone. This caused much dispute amongst officials on the policy of 'arresting regardless of suspicion', which some argued should apply only to common people and not the private affairs of an aristocratic lady.

In 1489, the Saheonbu reported that Yi Guji had mothered a daughter by her slave, who had married the previous year. The officials now argued that, though any previous investigation had been dismissed, this was a case of public morality. Seongjong ordered that all servants be tortured to investigate the claim. Cheonrye died during the interrogation and more than 40 people were arrested. Though some members of the government argued that death was too strong a punishment for a woman of the royal clan, it was agreed that death was more respectful than torture, and Yi was condemned. Yi’s daughter, Jun-bi, was not involved in her mother’s investigation as she had already left home in 1488, a year before Yi was executed, and was considered a part of her husband’s family.

Posthumous 
Yi was deleted from the royal family lineage (Sunwonrok) and her name remained taboo until the end of the Joseon Dynasty. Eoudong, Yu Gam-dong, Hwang Jin-yi, and Princess Consort Daebang (the aunt of Queen Jeongsun) are said to be examples of obscene women who didn’t stay faithful during the Joseon Dynasty. In the 1970s, her name was found in the Veritable Records of the Joseon Dynasty during the production of a new Hangul version.

Family 
 Father - Yi Je, Grand Prince Yangnyeong (이제 양녕대군) (1394 - 7 September 1462)
 Grandmother - Queen Wongyeong of the Yeoheung Min clan (원경왕후 민씨) (29 July 1365 - 18 August 1420)
 Grandfather - King Taejong of Joseon (조선 태종) (13 June 1367 - 30 May 1422)
 Mother 
 Unknown slave 
 Sibling(s) 
 Older sister - Lady Yi of the Jeonju Yi clan (전주 이씨, 全州李氏)
 Brother-in-law - Gwon Chi-jong (권치중, 權致中)
 Husbands and their children
 Gwon Deok-yeong (권덕영, 權德榮) (? - 1470)
 Unnamed son
 Unnamed son
 Cheonrye (천례, 天禮) (? - 4 October 1488)
 Daughter - Jun-bi (준비, 准非) (1475? - ?)
 Unnamed son-in-law

See also 
 Uhwudong
 Hwang Jini
 Shin Saimdang
 Heo Nanseolheon

References

Notes

Works cited

External links 
 조선왕조실록 

Year of birth unknown
1489 deaths
Korean writers
Korean female dancers
15th-century Korean poets
Korean artists
15th-century Korean women writers
15th-century Korean writers
15th-century Korean painters
People from North Chungcheong Province
House of Yi
Korean women poets
15th-century dancers
Princesses of Joseon
15th-century Korean women